Gertrude Clarke Nuttall (1868, Leicester – 4 May 1929, St. Albans, Hertfordshire) was a British botanist and science writer. She was one of the first women to take a degree in botany. She is best known as the author of the text for Wild Flowers as they Grow (1911), a book with colored photographs by H. Essenhigh Corke.

Life 
Gertrude Clark was born in 1868 to a Leicester surgeon J. St. Thomas Clarke and his wife. She was one of the first women to take a degree in botany, however it is not known in which British university she was educated. In 1893 Clarke married Dr. Charles Nuttall in Leicester.

Clarke Nuttall wrote many semipopular botanical articles, and in collaboration with H. Essenhigh Corke published Wild Flowers as they Grow (1911), Trees and how they Grow (1913), and Beautiful Flowering Shrubs (1920). Each of three works ran to several editions.

During World War I, she went to France with the British Red Cross and was in charge of recreation huts there.

Gertrude Clarke Nuttall died on 4 May 1929 in St. Albans, Hertfordshire aged 61.

Works 

 1905 – Guide to Leicester and Neighbourhood 
 1906 – French Prisoners in England: a side-light on the wars of Napoleon
1911 - Wild Flowers as they Grow
1913 - Trees and how they Grow
1920 - Beautiful Flowering Shrubs

References 

British botanists
British science writers
1868 births
1929 deaths
Women botanists